Ia is a genus of bat in the family Vespertilionidae. It belongs to the subfamily Vespertilioninae and has been placed in the tribe Vespertilionini. In the past, it has also been considered a synonym or subgenus of the genera Pipistrellus or Eptesicus, which used to contain many more species than they do now. Ia comprises a single living species, the great evening bat (I. io) of eastern and southeastern Asia, and one extinct fossil species, I. lanna, from the Miocene epoch in Thailand. Another living species, I. longimana, was recognized in the past, but it is no longer considered a valid species distinct from the great evening bat. 

At two letters, Ia ties the bat-like dinosaur Yi for the shortest possible name of any animal genus under the International Code of Zoological Nomenclature.

Notes

Vesper bats
Bat genera
Mammal genera with one living species
Taxa named by Oldfield Thomas